Pickerington High School Central is a public high school in Pickerington, Ohio, United States. It is one of two high schools in the Pickerington Local School District. In the city of Pickerington, it is referred to simply as Central and their mascot is the Tiger.
In 2003, "Pickerington High School" split into two high schools, Pickerington High School Central and Pickerington High School North. Construction of Pickerington High School, which currently houses Pickerington High School Central was completed in the fall of 1991.
The high schools which previously served the Pickerington community were Pickerington High School (1940 - 2003) and Violet Township High School (1906 - 1939). Before 1906, there were many schools in the Pickerington/Violet Township area. The Pickerington School (c.1883), a two-story, two-room school was built to replace the original building. Heritage Elementary is now housed in the Pickerington School.
The school has sports programs that include football, boys basketball, girls basketball, girls volleyball, boys volleyball, wrestling, boys tennis, girls tennis, boys soccer, girls soccer, boys golf, girls golf, cross country, cheerleading, track and field, baseball, softball, and Marching Band.

Athletics

Ohio High School Athletic Association State Championships

 Boys Cross Country – 1997 
 Girls Basketball – 1985, 1990, 1992, 1993, 1998, 1999, 2018 
 Softball – 1997 
 Boys Basketball – 2012, 2022
 Football – 2017, 2019 
 Boys Track – 2018, 2019

USA Today National Championships
 Girls Basketball – 1999

Football rivalries

Pickerington High School/Lancaster High School:
The annual game between Pickerington Central and Lancaster High School is sometimes referred to as the "Fight for Fairfield County" or the "Battle of 33". This game is between the two largest cities and schools in Fairfield County. Pickerington Central defeated Lancaster for the first time in a number of years during the 2007 season. During the 2007 season PHSC beat Lancaster twice, once during the regular season and once during the OHSAA Regional Quarter-Final game.

PHSC vs. PHSN: Pickerington High School North opened for the 2003–04 school year. In 2008, Central and North faced off in football for the first time at Crew Stadium. Adidas sponsored a trophy to commemorate this new rivalry. Nearly 15,000 people attended the game. The Purple and Black trophy supports a Victory Bell. The inaugural bell was awarded to Pickerington High School Central for their 38–7 victory over Pickerington High School North. It is now currently at Central.

Pickerington High School Central Marching Tiger Band

The band has competed in the Ohio Music Education Association's State Marching Band Competition for many years, consistently reaching the finals, and earning the state's highest honor, a Superior rating.

The band has marched in over 25 nationally televised parades, including five appearances in the Rose Parade (the only band from Ohio to do so) and four appearances in Macy's Parade. The band has performed for three presidents and performed at 16 NFL halftime shows.

National parades
 The Philadelphia Thanksgiving Day Parade – 1983, 1986 & 2012
 The Dallas Cotton Bowl Parade – 1989
 The New York Macy's Thanksgiving Day Parade – 1990, 1995, 2001, 2009
 The Pasadena Tournament of Roses Parade – 1993, 1997, 2006, 2010, 2019
 The Miami King Orange Jamboree Parade – 1994 & 2000
 The Atlantic City Miss America Pageant Parade – 1994
 The Phoenix Fiesta Bowl Parade and National Band Championship – 1999, 2003 & 2014
 The New York City National Veteran's Day Parade – 2003 & 2007
 The Columbus Veteran's Day Parade – 2005, 2006 & 2008
 The Washington 25th Anniversary Celebration of the Vietnam Wall and Parade – 2007
 The Orlando Citrus Bowl Parade - 2016
They placed third overall in the 2003 Fiesta Bowl Band Championship, and fifth in the 1999 Fiesta Bowl.
The band has had professional football game appearances with the Cincinnati Bengals, Cleveland Browns, Buffalo Bills, Indianapolis Colts, New York Jets, and Philadelphia Eagles.
Other performances include rallies for Senator John McCain (2008), Barack Obama (2008) President George W. Bush at the Nationwide Arena, President Ronald Reagan, President George H. W. Bush, Vice President James Danforth "Dan" Quayle, Senator Robert Dole, Governor George Voinovich and Mrs. Voinivich, Ohio Democratic Party Election reception, the Boy Scout National Council Meeting featuring Paul Harvey, OSU Skull session before the 2002 Washington State game, 2005 Northwestern game and the 2008 and 2012 Michigan Games, and the Columbus Dispatch OSU vs. Michigan Wigwam Pep Rally.

Notable alumni

Justin Boren, professional football player
Zach Boren, Class of 2011, professional football player
Shane Bowen, Class of 2005, professional football coach
Taco Charlton, Class of 2013, professional football player
DaVon Hamilton, Class of 2015, professional football player
Caris LeVert, Class of 2012, professional basketball player
Roger Lewis, Class of 2011, professional football player
Brian Peters, Class of 2010, professional football player
Jae'Sean Tate, Class of 2014, professional basketball player 
A.J. Trapasso, Class of 2004, professional football player

Notes and references

External links
 District Website
 Pickerington High Alumni Website
 

1940 establishments in Ohio
Educational institutions established in 1940
High schools in Fairfield County, Ohio
Public high schools in Ohio